Payton Otterdahl (born April 2, 1996) is an American male shot putter who competed in the 2020 Summer Olympics.

Biography
In winter 2019, at 23 years, his explosion, with 2nd world best measure (his personal best 21.81 m at time) in the world top lists IAAF and the 25th place in the new IAAF World Rankings.

Personal best
Shot put: 21.81 m,  Brookings, February 23, 2019 (outdoor 21.53 m Tucson May 12, 2019).
Shot put: 21.92 m, 2020 US Olympic Trials placing 3rd, Eugene, Oregon, June 18, 2021.

References

External links
 

1996 births
Living people
American male shot putters
North Dakota State Bison athletes
Athletes (track and field) at the 2020 Summer Olympics
Olympic track and field athletes of the United States